The Ministry of Justice was a cabinet ministry of the government of Rhodesia. It was responsible for overseeing the nation's laws, legal system and law enforcement.

The Ministry of Justice was established in 1923 during the colonial period of Southern Rhodesia. It retained the same structure when Rhodesia unilaterally declared independence in 1965. The Ministry was led by the Attorney General (until 1933) and the Minister of Justice (after 1932), who was appointed by Prime Minister. In 1979, Rhodesia became Zimbabwe Rhodesia as part of the Internal Settlement. In 1980 Zimbabwe gained its independence and the Ministry was succeeded by the Ministry of Justice of Zimbabwe.

List of Ministers

Attorney General (1894–1923)

Attorney General (1923–1933)

Ministers of Justice (1933–1979)

References 

Rhodesia
Southern Rhodesia
British colonial attorneys general in Africa
Justice
Rhodesia, Minister of Justice of
Rhodesia, Ministry of Justice of
Justice
Justice
1923 establishments in Southern Rhodesia
Justice